SM UB-29 was a German Type UB II submarine or U-boat in the German Imperial Navy during World War I. The U-boat was ordered on 30 April 1915 and launched on 31 December 1915. She was commissioned into the German Imperial Navy on 18 January 1916 as SM UB-29.

The Landrail might have mistaken UB-29 for another boat, possibly the UC-19.

The UB-29s wreckage – exceptionally well preserved and with the hull still intact – was found by Belgian divers in the summer of 2017, and formally identified in November 2017. Its exact location was not published, in order to enable further research and protection of the site.

Design
A German Type UB II submarine, UB-29 had a displacement of  when at the surface and  while submerged. The submarine was powered by two Benz six-cylinder diesel engines producing a total , two Siemens-Schuckert electric motors producing , and one propeller shaft.

UB-29 was fitted with two  torpedo tubes, four torpedoes, and one  SK L/40 deck gun. She had a complement of twenty-one crew members and two officers and a thirty-second dive time.

Summary of raiding history

Wreckage 
The well preserved wreckage of the submarine was discovered in 2017 off the coast of Ostend. Hence, the assumption that it was sunk south of Goodwin Sands after a collision with HMS Landrail cannot be maintained. One possible explanation is that UB-29 escaped after the collision, and ran into a mine in Belgian waters. Another explanation is that HMS Landrail sank another U-boat, possibly the UC-19. The German government decided to leave the 22 crew members in the wreckage. Only some minor artefacts lying outside the submarine will be salvaged for an exposition in Belgium and will later be handed to the Internationales Maritimes Museum Hamburg.

Notes

References

Bibliography 

 

1915 ships
Ships built in Bremen (state)
World War I submarines of Germany
German Type UB II submarines
U-boats commissioned in 1916
Maritime incidents in 1916
U-boats sunk in 1916
U-boats sunk by depth charges
U-boats sunk by British warships
World War I shipwrecks in the North Sea
Ships lost with all hands